Boss Drum is the Shamen's 1992 album, released a year after the death of bassist Will Sinnott. It features their hit UK number one single "Ebeneezer Goode". Critics gave the album positive feedback and the album reached number three on the UK Albums Chart, and was certified platinum by the British Phonographic Industry in December 1992.

Critical reception
Dennis Romero from Philadelphia Inquirer wrote, "Using the dry synthesizer sounds of techno, the chanting of rap, and the 120 beats-per-minute pace of "house" music, the group has, with this second album, pushed the technological edge further than Depeche Mode and Erasure ever have done. [...] While much popular music still promotes the protest values of the '60s counterculture, Boss Drum continues to profess the individualism and racial unity of today's youth. This carpe diem strain, found in "Phorever People" and "Space Time", for example, befit a twentysomething generation that internalizes values. Meanwhile, "LSI (Love Sex Intelligence)" is a catchy, soulful, house-paced jam that sounds chart-ready."

Track listing

LP (TPLP42)
 "Boss Drum" – 6:26
 "LSI (Love Sex Intelligence)" – 3:43
 "Space Time" – 4:58
 "Librae Solidi Denari" – 5:26
 "Ebeneezer Goode" (Band Mix) – 4:31
 "Comin' On" – 4:27
 "Phorever People" – 4:52
 "Fatman" – 5:39
 "Scientas" – 5:38
 "Re:Evolution" (featuring Terence McKenna) – 8:22

Cassette (TPLP42C)
 "Boss Drum" – 6:26
 "LSI (Love Sex Intelligence)" – 3:43
 "Space Time" – 4:58
 "Librae Solidi Denari" – 5:26
 "Ebeneezer Goode" (Beatmasters Mix) – 6:12
 "Comin' On" – 4:27
 "Phorever People" – 4:52
 "Fatman" – 5:39
 "Scientas" – 5:38
 "Re:Evolution" (featuring Terence McKenna) – 8:22

CD (TPLP42CD)
 "Boss Drum" – 6:26
 "LSI (Love Sex Intelligence)" – 3:43
 "Space Time" – 4:58
 "Librae Solidi Denari" – 5:26
 "Ebeneezer Goode" (Beatmasters Mix) – 6:16
 "Comin' On" – 4:27
 "Phorever People" – 4:52
 "Fatman" – 5:39
 "Scientas" – 5:38
 "Re:Evolution" (featuring Terence McKenna) – 8:22
 "Boss Dub" – 5:19
 "Phorever Dub" – 3:53

Charts

Weekly charts

Year-end charts

References

1992 albums
The Shamen albums
One Little Independent Records albums